Swedish Republican Association is a politically and religiously independent association that promotes the abolition of the Monarchy of Sweden and the establishment of a republican form of government after the Finnish model. The Swedish Republican Association was founded in 1997 by Magnus Simonsson and Fredrik Högberg. The current chairperson is Ulf Bergström.

List of chairpersons

'This Year's Republican' Award 
2005 Vilhelm Moberg (posthumously)
2006 Ann Svanberg
2007 Mikael Wiehe
2008 Karolina Fjellborg, journalist
2009 Johan Croneman, journalist
2010 Sydsvenskan, Lars Ohly, former party chairperson of the Left Party
2011 Lena Andersson, author and journalist
2012 Inga-Britt Ahlenius, civil servant
2013 Özz Nûjen, stand-up comedian
2014 Pehr G. Gyllenhammar, businessman
2015 Maria Ripenberg, journalist
2016 Emil Mörk, teacher
2017 not awarded
2018 Thomas Lyrevik, author
2019 Finland
2020 Joar Forssell, member of the Riksdag from the Liberal Party

See also
 Republicanism in Sweden
 Alliance of European Republican Movements

Notes

External links
 
 Sweden: Cost of royal wedding triggers monarchy debate
 'Royal wedding boosts republican cause': MP, The Local

Political organizations based in Sweden
Non-profit organizations based in Sweden
Organizations established in 1997
Republicanism in Sweden
Republican organizations
1997 establishments in Sweden